Witton-le-Wear railway station is a railway station on the Weardale heritage railway serves the village of Witton-le-Wear in County Durham, North East England, and is the penultimate stop for most of line's eastbound passenger services (though one return service from  train per day currently terminates here rather than continuing to the eastern terminus at ). The current station platform is located on the opposite side of the track to the original railway station which was operation between 1847 and 1953.

History 

It was found that this station's location on a curved and steeply graded section of the line made it difficult to start passenger trains from it and thus, in the 1880s, the North Eastern Railway constructed a new station 20 chains to the east, on the east side of Witton-le-Wear level crossing. On 21 October 1895, the Stanhope line was extended once again to reach .

Opposite the second station was a single road goods shed and a coal drop while on the west side of the level crossing was another siding serving a horse and cattle dock. The station was closed to passengers on 27 June 1953 and to goods traffic on 1 November 1965.

The station was closed to passengers by British Railways (BR) on 29 June 1953 and goods on 1 November 1965. Though stopping goods trains had been withdrawn, the line was retained to serve the cement works ad, in 1988 BR introduced a summer Sunday extension to the regular  to  'Heritage Line' service to Stanhope though no stop was provided at Witton-le-Wear (the second station had been demolished in April 1973) and the service was subsequently withdrawn after the summer of 1992. The remaining freight was withdrawn on 17 March 1993.

Weardale Railway 

Rather than close the line when freight traffic was withdrawn, the line was mothballed and a campaign began in 1993 to preserve the line as a heritage railway. However the organisation struggled financially and the service was suspended a short time later, not recommencing until August 2006.

After major efforts to clear the line of vegetation and repair damaged tracks, passenger services along the section between Stanhope and  through Witton-le-Wear were reintroduced 23 May 2010. In early August 2012, the Weardale Railway announced that a new £25,000 station was under construction (using elements from the first temporary platform at Bishop Auckland West station) as a result of a joint initiative with Witton-le-Wear Parish Council, the Witton Castle Country Park and Durham County Council. However, by the time the station was ready for use, the 2012 season had ended and, in 2013, it was announced that regular passenger services had been discontinued.

In June 2014 a limited, volunteer-run passenger service was reintroduced between Stanhope and Wolsingham using a class 122 "Bubble Car" and on 27 March 2016 this service was extended to Witton-le-Wear, nearly four years after the station had been constructed.  In April 2018, the Weardale Railway CIC announced that works had commenced to lift a short section of track at Broken Banks (approximately 1/2 mile west of Bishop Auckland station) to enable the embankment to be repaired after subsidence had made the line unusable for passenger traffic. Once the works are complete it is intended to reinstate the tracks and extend the Stanhope to Witton-le-Wear passenger service back to Bishop Auckland West station.  Since July 2018, two of the three daily return services between Stanhope and Witton-le-Wear have continued to Bishop Auckland West station.

References

External links 

Railway stations in County Durham
Former North Eastern Railway (UK) stations
Railway stations in Great Britain opened in 1852
Railway stations in Great Britain closed in 1953
Railway stations in Great Britain opened in 2016
1852 establishments in England
1965 disestablishments in England
Heritage railway stations in England
Witton-le-Wear